

Alfred Kuhnert (19 March 1898 – 28 November 1977) was a German general during World War II who commanded several divisions.  He was a recipient of the Knight's Cross of the Iron Cross of Nazi Germany.

Awards 

 Knight's Cross of the Iron Cross on 20 April 1944 as Oberst and commander of Grenadier-Regiment 51 (motorized)

References

Citations

Bibliography

 

1898 births
1977 deaths
People from Kluczbork
German Army personnel of World War I
Major generals of the German Army (Wehrmacht)
Recipients of the Gold German Cross
Recipients of the Knight's Cross of the Iron Cross
German prisoners of war in World War II held by the Soviet Union
German prisoners of war in World War II held by the United States
Recipients of the clasp to the Iron Cross, 2nd class
German Army generals of World War II